The 1979 Oakland Raiders season was their 10th in the league, and 20th overall. They matched their previous season's output of 9–7. Oakland started off 1–3, rallied to 6–4, then fell to 6–6 after an upset loss to the Kansas City chiefs. Oakland then went on a three-game winning streak that featured a 14–10 defensive struggle in Denver, a comeback win in New Orleans after trailing 35–14 in the 3rd quarter, and a 19–14 win over the Cleveland Browns. In the season finale the Raiders stood at 9–6 in need of a win at home against the Seattle Seahawks to have a shot at a wildcard playoff spot. However, it was not to be, and Seattle quarterback Jim Zorn's 314 yards and 2 TD passes eliminated the Raiders, 29–24.

This was the first season since 1964 that the Raiders finished lower than second place in the AFL/AFC West.

Offseason

Draft

Roster

Schedule

Season summary

Week 1

Week 2

Week 3

Week 4

Week 5

Week 6

Week 7

Week 8

Week 9

Source: Pro-Football-Reference.com

Week 10

Week 11

Week 12

Week 13

Week 14

Week 15

Week 16

Standings

References

Oakland Raiders seasons
Oakland Raiders
Oakland Raiders